Serhiy Datsenko may refer to:
Serhiy Datsenko (footballer born 1977), Ukrainian footballer
Serhiy Datsenko (footballer born 1987), Ukrainian footballer